Fuquan is a county-level city in east-central Guizhou province of the People's Republic of China.

Climate

References

External links
Official website of Fuquan government

Fuquan
Qiannan Buyei and Miao Autonomous Prefecture